Hector Caron (August 31, 1862 – April 9, 1937) was a politician in the Quebec, Canada.  He served as Member of the Legislative Assembly.

Early life

He was born on August 31, 1862 in Saint-Léon, Mauricie.

Provincial Politics

Caron ran as a Liberal candidate to the Legislative Assembly of Quebec in 1892 in the district of Maskinongé.  He defeated Conservative incumbent Joseph Lessard.  He was re-elected in 1897 and 1900.

His last election was declared void though.  A by-election was called to settle the matter, which he lost against Conservative candidate Georges Lafontaine.

Death

He died on April 9, 1937.

References

1862 births
1937 deaths
Quebec Liberal Party MNAs